Danny Vinson (born May 6, 1954) is an American character actor.

Career
He is best known for his role on The Walking Dead as David, episode "Live Bait" (2013). He also had memorable performances as the Ticket Taker and Elder Dan on Will Ferrell's Talladega Nights: The Ballad of Ricky Bobby and The Campaign respectively, as well as verbally sparring with Reese Witherspoon as the Texarkana MC on Walk The Line.

Filmography

Film

Television

References

Living people
American male television actors
1954 births
American male film actors
20th-century American male actors
21st-century American male actors
Place of birth missing (living people)